The Embassy of the Republic of Indonesia in Brasília is the diplomatic mission of the Republic of Indonesia to the Federative Republic of Brazil. The current ambassador, Edi Yusup, was appointed by President Joko Widodo on 7 January 2019.

See also 

 Brazil–Indonesia relations
 List of diplomatic missions of Indonesia

References 

Brasília
Indonesia